Do the Math may refer to:
 Do the Math (2013), film of 350.org featuring Bill McKibben
 "Do the Math" (1998), song of the singer George Fox
 Do the Math, a pricing game
Do the Math an advertising slogan for the Atari Jaguar